Mitchell James Robert McCarron (born 30 June 1992) is an Australian professional basketball player who plays for the Adelaide 36ers of the National Basketball League (NBL).

College career
In 2010, McCarron attended the Australian Institute of Sport. He played college basketball in the United States for Metropolitan State University of Denver (Metro State) between 2012 and 2015. During his three seasons with the Roadrunners, he led the team to back to back NCAA Division II Final Four appearances, including a runner-up finish in 2013. He averaged 16.3 points and 6.7 rebounds for his career and in 2015 was named NABC Player of the Year.

Professional career
Following college, McCarron played one season for Palencia Baloncesto of Spain's Second Division. He signed a two-year deal with the Cairns Taipans in his native Australia on 13 May 2016. After a stint with Petrol Olimpija following the 2017–18 NBL season, McCarron signed a three-year deal with Melbourne United on 8 June 2018. On 28 February 2019, he signed with the Southland Sharks for the 2019 New Zealand NBL season. He left the Sharks mid-season due to a lingering knee complaint. McCarron rejoined Melbourne. He averaged 10.2 points, 5.0 rebounds, and 5.1 assists per game during the 2020–21 season.

On 13 July 2021, McCarron signed a three-year deal with the Adelaide 36ers.

References

External links
NBL profile
Metro State Roadrunners bio
"An Aussie Abroad: Ballin' in Auckland City" at thesportssource.com.au

1992 births
Living people
Adelaide 36ers players
Australian expatriate basketball people in the United States
Australian men's basketball players
Australian Institute of Sport basketball players
Australian expatriate sportspeople in New Zealand
Australian expatriate basketball people in Spain
Cairns Taipans players
KK Olimpija players
Melbourne United players
Metro State Roadrunners men's basketball players
Palencia Baloncesto players
People from Alice Springs
Shooting guards
Southland Sharks players
Super City Rangers players